Yorcelly Isoleth Humphreys Abella (born 3 September 2001) is a Nicaraguan footballer who plays as a centre back for Turkish Women's Football Super League club Sivasspor and the Nicaragua women's national team.

Early life
Humphreys was born in Bluefields.

Club career
Humphreys started her career in 2016 with Nicaraguan women's football championship side Las Leyendas. On August 19, 2020, she signed with UNAN Managua.

On March 3, 2022, she signed to play for Sivasspor in Turkey.

International career
Humphreys capped for Nicaragua at senior level during the 2020 CONCACAF Women's Olympic Qualifying Championship qualification.

References 

2001 births
Living people
People from Bluefields
Nicaraguan women's footballers
Women's association football central defenders
Sivasspor (women's football) players
Turkish Women's Football Super League players
Nicaragua women's international footballers
Nicaraguan expatriate footballers
Nicaraguan expatriate sportspeople in Turkey
Expatriate women's footballers in Turkey